Matthew "Matt" Chapman (born 14 July 1981) is a former English professional darts player, who played in Professional Darts Corporation events.

Career
Chapman qualified for the 2002 PDC World Darts Championship, but lost 4–1 to Dennis Priestley in the last 32. In the 2004 UK Open, he was at the end of a nine-dart finish from Phil Taylor.

World Championship performances

PDC
 2002: Last 32: (lost to Dennis Priestley 1–4)

References

External links

1981 births
Living people
English darts players
Professional Darts Corporation former pro tour players